Leptostylus batesi is a species of longhorn beetles of the subfamily Lamiinae. It was described by Casey in 1913, and is known from Panama.

References

Leptostylus
Beetles described in 1913